Book of Tang may refer to:

Old Book of Tang, a 10th-century history book about the Tang Dynasty
New Book of Tang, an 11th-century history book about the Tang Dynasty

See also
 Tang Huiyao, the Institutional History of Tang
 Canonical Book of the Tang Dynasty (disambiguation)
 Book of Southern Tang (disambiguation)